Volcano Security Suite is a piece of harmful security software that disguises itself as an antispyware program. It issues a false messages and alerts, and false system scan results on the computer to scare people to pay for the full version of the rogue software. It is a part of FakeVimes family.

Symptoms of infection 

 It attempts to disable some legitimate antivirus programs.
 It can also hijack the Internet Explorer.
 It also displays false alerts stating that the computer is infected with malware.

Removal 

Volcano Security Suite can be detected and removed by certain antivirus and antispyware like SpyHunter malware suite, as well as Malwarebytes antimalware.

See also 
 Rogue security software

References 

Rogue software